For the year, see 416 or 416 BC. 416 is the number between 415 and 417.

416 may also refer to:

 April 16
 416 (number)
 416, the area code for Toronto, Canada
 Heckler & Koch HK416
 .416 Barrett
 .416 Rigby
 416, a visual novel
 UR-416, a West German armoured car
 Ontario Highway 416